Bodo Alexander Bischoff (born 24 April 1952) is a German musicologist and Choral conductor.

Education and career 
A study of pedagogy and school music for teacher training, as well as music theory followed (with Heinrich Metzler and ) and musicology (with Elmar Budde and Helmut Kühn) at the Berlin University of the Arts. He also studied biology and musicology with Klaus Kropfinger and Rudolf Stephan at the Free University of Berlin. In 1979 he passed his second state examination in school music and biology.

Since 1981 Bischoff has been a student councilor in the university service at the Musicology Department of the Free University of Berlin. In 1992 he received his doctorate in musicology, and his dissertation dealt with the development of Beethoven's reception of Robert Schumann.

Since 1992 he has held a teaching position for musicology at the University of Kassel. From the winter semester 1997/98 to the summer semester 1999, he held a deputy professor post for musicology at the University of Kassel and was head of the School Music Department. He was appointed to the Scientific State Examination Office of the University of Kassel and became a member of the commission for the development of a new concept for the amendment of the study courses of school music, applied musicology and music education at the University of Kassel.

Publications 
 Monument für Beethoven. Die Entwicklung der Beethoven-Rezeption Robert Schumanns. Cologne 1994,  (simultaneously: dissertation at the Freie Universität Berlin)
 with Andreas Eichhorn, Ulrich Siebert and Thomas Gerlich (edits.): Klaus Kropfinger: Über Musik im Bilde. Schriften zu Analyse, Ästhetik und Rezeption in Musik und Kunst.'' 2 volumes. Cologne 1995,

External links 
 
 Bischoff bei Cantus – geistliche Musik
 Bischoff im Verlag Dohr

References 

Musicologists from Berlin
20th-century German musicologists
21st-century German musicologists
Beethoven scholars
German choral conductors
1952 births
Living people